Erik Sjöberg is a historian and associate professor at Södertörn University.

Works

References

Living people
Academic staff of Södertörn University
21st-century Swedish historians
People from Huddinge Municipality
Year of birth missing (living people)